The President's Award may refer to:

Gaisce, The President's Award, Ireland
NAACP Image Award - President's Award, United States
Rashtrapati Award - Award given by the President of India
the highest rank of the Kiribati Scout Association